Carencro (historically ) is a city in Lafayette Parish, Louisiana, United States. It is a suburb of the nearby city of Lafayette. The population was 7,526 at the 2010 census, up from 6,120 in 2000; at the 2020 census, its population was 9,272. The name of the city is derived from the Cajun French word for buzzard; the spot where the community was settled was one where large flocks of American black vultures roosted in the bald cypress trees. The name means "carrion crow." Carencro is part of the Lafayette metropolitan area.

Etymology
Many senior Carencro natives attest that the town's name originates from before the American Civil War.  According to this local legend, Native Americans told Vermilionville settlers that in old times a large number of "carrion crows" (vultures, called carencro in French) had settled around the Vermilion River between Lafayette and Opelousas, Louisiana to feast on a fish die-off.

There is a related theory, consistent with the spelling, that the place is named for the carencro tête rouge, a red-headed buzzard referred to by European explorers as early as 1699, and described in 1774 by Antoine-Simon Le Page du Pratz.  Du Pratz described the bird as having black plumage and a head covered with red flesh.  He said the Spanish government protected the birds, "for as they do not use the whole carcass of the buffaloes which (the Spaniards) kill, those birds eat what they leave, which otherwise, by rotting on the ground, would ... infect the air." 

In a letter written on April 23, 1802, Martin Duralde, a former commandant of the Opelousas post, related the legend as it had come down from an Attakapas Indian.  Duralde wrote: "Many years before the discovery of the elephant in the bayou called  an Attakapas savage had informed a man who is at present in my service in the capacity of cow-herd that the ancestors of his nation transmitted (the story) to their descendants that a beast of enormous size had perished either in this bayou or in one of the two water courses a short distance from it without their being able to indicate the true place, the antiquity of the event having without doubt made them forget it." (Note: The mastodon became extinct 4500–10,000 years ago)

A late 19th-century account stated the legend came from buzzards (vultures) feasting on a mastodon carcass. Its fossilized bones were reportedly discovered and collected by a French naturalist in the 18th century and shipped to the Jardin des Plantes of Paris, but the ship was wrecked on the way, and the bones were lost at sea.  The only relic of the mastodon was a femur or leg bone, which was kept by an early settler, the first Guilbeau.  He used it as a pestle to bruise indigo for processing, a crop then cultivated in the Attakapas Indian country.  The Indians termed the birds carecros; and from the spot where the mastodon died, the river takes the name of Bayou Carencro.

First called St. Pierre, in the late 19th century, the town was renamed Carencro, after the "carrion crow" (vulture) legend.  Although Carencro's current town center lies well west of the Vermilion River, this legend has permanence within the community.

Some people think that the name comes from the Spanish carnero, meaning "bone pile."  This idea also comes from the mastodon legend, and the idea that the buzzards left nothing but a pile of white bones after they had picked the mastodon clean.

History

Early settlement
Few European people settled in the Carencro area (around Lafayette) until the coming of the Acadian refugees in the 18th century.  Some of the Acadians transported in 1765 to the Attakapas district were given lands along Bayou Carencro, although probably not in what is now the town of Carencro.  At that time, Jean and Marin Mouton, Charles Peck, Louis Pierre Arceneaux and others began to establish vacheries in the vicinity.  More cattlemen would follow after 1770, when Spanish Gov. Alejandro O'Reilly decreed that "a grant of 42 arpents [] in front by 42 in depth could be issued only to those who owned 100 head of tame cattle, some sheep and horses, and two slaves to oversee them."

In 1769, Juan Kelly and Eduardo Nugent toured the area for the government and reported to O'Reilly that "the inhabitants maintain everything imaginable in the way of livestock, such as cows, horses and sheep."  A Frenchman named Lyonnet, visiting in 1793, found thousands of cattle on the Attakapas and Opelousas prairies.

Jean and Marin Mouton were among the early settlers on Bayou Carencro. Other early settlers in the Carencro area were Charles Peck, Traveille Bernard, Rosamond Breaux, Ovignar Arceneaux, and the Babineaux family.  An 1803 census of the Carencro area listed family names including Arceneaux, Babineaux, Benoit, Bernard, Breaux, Carmouche, Caruthers, Comeaux, Cormier, Guilbeaux, Hébert, Holway, LeBlanc, Melançon, Mire, Mouton, Pierre, Prejean, Roger, St. Julien, Savoie, and Thibodeaux.

First post office
The first post office in Carencro was established on January 11, 1872, with Auguste Melchior as postmaster.  The telegraph line reached there in 1884.  The first telephones were installed by the Teche and Vermilion Telephone Line in 1894.  The company was headquartered in New Iberia.

Historic churches

According to Roger Baudier's history of the Catholic Church of Louisiana, the Carencro area was first served from Grand Coteau, Louisiana, later from Vermilionville, and then from Breaux Bridge, Louisiana.  The parish of St. Peter was established in 1874 and the archdiocese sent Father Andre Marie Guillot as its first pastor.  The church was at first called St. Pierre au Carencro, named for Pierre Cormier, who donated land for the first church.   Before a church was established at Carencro, services were held in the Carmouche blacksmith shop.  Father Guillot died of yellow fever while serving in Carencro and was buried in the church cemetery.

According to Baudier, "(Father Guillot's) successor was Father J.F Suriray.   Trouble with the parishioners arose and Father Suriray was threatened by the people.  Some three years after his coming to Carencro, he was obliged to leave.   Some time after, the church was destroyed by fire and the parish remained without a pastor until 1883."

A new church was built in 1893, but was destroyed by a tornado before it was ever used.  Another church was built, and it burned in 1904.   The current church was built in 1906 under the administration of Father F.J. Grimeaux, who served the parish for some 25 years.  A plaque outside notes the donation of the land by the Jean Jacques Coussan family.  A young carpenter named Hector Connolly worked for $2.50 a day to build the 110-foot steeple.  Father Grimeaux, in addition to serving as pastor, organized and played clarinet in the Carencro Brass Band.

The Church of the Assumption was completed in 1925 to serve a black congregation.  The Holy Ghost Fathers accepted an invitation to direct the parish and sent Father Joseph Dolan as the first pastor.  Assumption Church continues to operate today with its original structure still intact and is the only white, wood-frame structure of its kind in the Diocese of Lafayette.

Our Lady of the Assumption Religious Complex consists of the church, rectory, school, Drexel Parish Hall (former Sisters of the Blessed Sacrament Convent), the church cemetery, and St. Katharine Drexel Shrine.  The complex was listed on the State and National Register of Historic Places in November 2001.

Historic schools
Assumption School was built in 1932 and was staffed by the Sisters of the Blessed Sacrament.  Assumption School was the combination of several black schools in the area.  The school was operated with finances from Saint Katharine Drexel.  After the 1950s, the Sisters of the Blessed Sacrament taught at Carencro Catholic School, located at the west end of Church Street.  In the early 1980s, Assumption School Combined with St. Pierre School to form Carencro Catholic.

About the turn of the century, Father J.B. Laforet sold three lots to Mother St. Patrick of the Sisters of Mount Carmel, who opened St. Ann's School of Carencro, in 1897.

In 1874, what was probably the first school in Carencro, was opened on the Auguste Melchior farm. Melchior, a Frenchman who had come here from New Orleans, was named director of the Lafayette Parish educational system about 1870. His wife, Viviana, taught at the Carencro school.

In 1889, Carencro had two private schools.  Charles Heichelheim, a German, ran a school for boys, and Edmond Villére operated one for both boys and girls.  That year, the first public school was built in Carencro, and a second story was added to it 10 years later.  The school became an approved high school about 1917.

Economic prosperity
The Opelousas Courier reported on the young settlement at least twice during the year 1879.  The April 19 edition stated, "This little village is rapidly expanding. ... The grounds of the church have been planted in trees and enclosed with a fence of a new kind.  This enclosure is of iron wire and armed with steel barbs, forming a barrier inaccessible to animals." 

On September 6, the newspaper gave this account: "The little village of St. Pierre, at Carencro, born only a short time ago, tends to stretch itself in an astonishing fashion with numbers of buildings where all kinds of trades and professions are prospering there.   Many beautiful stores, well assorted with that which meets the needs of the inhabitants, are established there since a short time ago and we note, among others, the fine establishment of Mr. Ignace Bernard near the church." 

By 1889, Carencro had two sugar factories, one operated by J.C. Couvillon, and another run by I. Singleton.  In 1894, Victor E. Dupuis, one of the larger cane growers of the area, formed the Carencro Sugar Company to build another sugar mill alongside Morgan's Railroad.  The sugar mills in the area closed about 1900.

There were several horse-powered cotton gins in Carencro before 1876, but, in that year, Avignac Arceneaux built the first steam-powered gin in the parish. Four more gins went up there in the late 1880s and in the 1890s.  In 1889, 1,800 bales of cotton were shipped from the Carencro Station.  Cotton gins continued to operate in Carencro until the middle 1970s, when the last two, Cotton Products Co. and Farmer's Gin Co., were closed.

Merchants and plantation owners
Among leading merchants in the 1890s were the Brown Brothers, Jacob Mitchell, D. Daret, A.G. Guilbeau, G. Schmuler, C. Micou, and J.C. Martin.  People owning large plantations near the town were Mrs. Z. Broussard, Dr. R.J. Francez, Mrs. O.C. Mouton, Louis Roger, Mrs. F. Abadie, C.C. Brown, St. Clair Kilchrist, V.C. Dupuis. and L.J. Arceneaux. Entrepreneur Charles J. Richard opened the town's lumberyard along the Southern Pacific Railroad.  Nearly 100 years later, the enterprise closed during a regional economic recession in 1985.

In 1891, historian William Henry Perrin suggested that "there is no prettier site for a town (than Carencro) nor one with more solid advantages than comprised in this place. "

Modern

Carencro's St. Peter's Catholic Church and cemetery form an artistic centerpiece of the town.  St. Peter's Catholic Church has an ornate cypress-carved entrance, altar and narthex, as well as intricate pew end caps.  The pews were once sold to parishioners to raise money for the church. These unique end caps were designed by Catholic Frs. Wassler and Edwards. (Both deceased)

Carencro notables such as former postmaster William J. Broussard and former lumberyard owner Oliver Richard are buried in this cemetery. Carencro's cemetery is above ground, unlike low-lying areas to the east in the Atchafalaya Basin and areas below Baton Rouge, which eschew the ground-level graves of Lafayette (as well as points west and north) for mausoleums.

The City Hall and Fire Station, designed by local architect Lynn Guidry, is a modern counterpoint to the traditional Catholic church, and can be seen at the southern turn of Church Street east of U.S. 182.

Geography

Demographics

As of the 2020 United States census, there were 9,272 people, 3,533 households, and 1,980 families residing in the city. According to the 2019 American Community Survey, its racial and ethnic makeup was 52.1% non-Hispanic white, 46.0% Black and African American, 0.1% American Indian and Alaska Native, 0.3% Asian, 1.1% some other race, and 0.3% two or more races. The median household income was $39,162 and 19.0% of the population lived at or below the poverty line.

At the 2000 U.S. census, there were 6,120 people, 2,237 households, and 1,579 families residing in the city. The racial makeup of the city was 56.37% White, 42.19% African American, 0.20% Native American, 0.23% Asian, 0.25% from other races, and 0.77% from two or more races. Hispanic or Latin Americans of any race were 1.09% of the population.

There were 2,237 households, out of which 39.8% had children under the age of 18 living with them, 45.4% were married couples living together, 21.1% had a female householder with no husband present, and 29.4% were non-families. 25.5% of all households were made up of individuals, and 9.3% had someone living alone who was 65 years of age or older. The average household size was 2.66 and the average family size was 3.19.

In the city, the population was spread out, with 30.2% under the age of 18, 9.2% from 18 to 24, 28.5% from 25 to 44, 19.8% from 45 to 64, and 12.3% who were 65 years of age or older. The median age was 33 years.  For every 100 females, there were 88.0 males. For every 100 females age 18 and over, there were 80.5 males.

The median income for a household in the city was $22,716, and the median income for a family was $27,539. Males had a median income of $27,879 versus $21,496 for females. The per capita income for the city was $11,491. About 24.1% of families and 29.8% of the population were below the poverty line, including 42.6% of those under age 18 and 27.1% of those age 65 or over.

Sister city

Dieppe, New Brunswick, Canada
Leuze-en-Hainaut, Belgium

References

External links

 City of Carencro

Populated places established in 1765
Cities in Louisiana
Cities in Lafayette Parish, Louisiana
Cities in Lafayette, Louisiana metropolitan area